Helminthophis praeocularis is a species of snake in the Anomalepididae family. It is endemic to Colombia.

References

Anomalepididae
Snakes of South America
Reptiles of Colombia
Endemic fauna of Colombia
Reptiles described in 1924